Patrick Brian Chambers (born December 13, 1970) is an American college basketball coach and is the current head coach at Florida Gulf Coast University. He is formerly the head men's basketball coach at Penn State and Boston University.

Biography
Born in Newtown Square, Pennsylvania, Chambers played collegiate basketball at Philadelphia University from 1990 to 1994.  Despite joining the team without a scholarship, he left it as the starting point guard and the team record-holder in assists.  He is currently 7th all-time in steals and led the team to four NCAA Division II Sweet 16 appearances and two Elite Eight finishes.

Chambers took over for Dennis Wolff as the head coach at Boston University following the 2008–09 season.  He was previously the associate head coach at Villanova University.  He started at Villanova as director of operations in May 2004.  He was promoted to assistant coach after one season and finally Associate Head Coach in June 2008.  Prior to Villanova, Chambers was an assistant at Philadelphia University, Delaware Valley College and Episcopal Academy.  In his first season at BU, Chambers led the Terriers to a 21–14 overall record and an 11–5 mark in league play.  The Terriers fell just short of an America East Tournament Championship after falling to University of Vermont 83–70 on March 13, 2010.  The team did qualify for the 3rd annual College Basketball Invitational and won their first postseason game since 1959.  They also hosted the first postseason game in program history, defeating Morehead State University in overtime at Case Gymnasium.

In Chambers' second season at Boston University, he again led the Terriers to a 21–14 overall mark, including a 12–4 mark in conference play.  They defeated Stony Brook University at Agganis Arena to win their sixth conference title and clinch an automatic bid into the NCAA tournament.  They received a #16 seed and fell to the #1 seed Kansas Jayhawks in the round of 64 by a score of 72–53.  The game marked the Terriers' first appearance in the NCAA tournament since 2002.

Penn State announced Chambers as the 12th head coach in Nittany Lion basketball history in June 2011. The best season Chambers has had at Penn State so far has been the 2017–18 season where the team finished 26–13 and had its highest Big Ten finish in his tenure. The season was highlighted with 3 wins over Ohio State and a 2018 NIT Championship. However, in 2019 Chambers had the team ranked at #23 for their first AP appearance since 1996 after a win over then #4 ranked Maryland and a hot 10–2 start. 

Chambers stepped down from his head coaching position at Penn State on October 21, 2020, following an investigation into his past conduct.  He was replaced by Jim Ferry, who coached the team in an interim capacity.

In November 2021, Chambers was hired as an assistant coach at La Salle under Ashley Howard. He was hired as head coach of Florida Gulf Coast University on March 14, 2022.

Chambers and his wife Courtney have four children: Grace, Ryan, Caitlin, and Patrick.

Head coaching record

References

External links

 Penn State profile
 Villanova profile

1971 births
Living people
American men's basketball coaches
Basketball coaches from Pennsylvania
Basketball players from Pennsylvania
Boston University Terriers men's basketball coaches
College men's basketball head coaches in the United States
Delaware Valley Aggies men's basketball coaches
La Salle Explorers men's basketball coaches
Penn State Nittany Lions basketball coaches
Florida Gulf Coast Eagles men's basketball coaches
People from Newtown Township, Delaware County, Pennsylvania
Philadelphia Rams men's basketball coaches
Philadelphia Rams men's basketball players
Point guards
Sportspeople from Delaware County, Pennsylvania
Villanova Wildcats men's basketball coaches
American men's basketball players